Kameron Darnel Chancellor (born April 3, 1988), nicknamed "Bam Bam", is an American former football strong safety who played for the Seattle Seahawks of the National Football League (NFL). He played college football at Virginia Tech prior to being drafted by the Seahawks in the fifth round of the 2010 NFL Draft. A four-time Pro Bowler, he was one of the key members of their Legion of Boom secondary. He also helped lead the Seahawks to victory in Super Bowl XLVIII. Chancellor retired following complications from a neck injury he suffered in 2017.

Early life
Chancellor was born in Norfolk, Virginia, on April 3, 1988. He attended Matthew Fontaine Maury High School where he played basketball and football as a quarterback and safety for the Commodores athletic teams. As a senior in 2005, he recorded more than 2,000 passing yards and 500 rushing yards and led his team to a 10–2 record and an appearance in the Group AAA Division 5 playoffs. Chancellor was named the team's most valuable player, and he was also placed on the All-Eastern District first-team as well as The Virginian-Pilot All-Tidewater second-team. Rivals.com assessed him as the 27th-ranked pro-style quarterback prospect in the nation and the 20th-ranked player in the state of Virginia. SuperPrep and The Roanoke Times rated him the 21st-ranked player in the state. The 247Sports recruiting site assessed Chancellor as a three-star recruit and he accepted a scholarship offer from Virginia Tech.

College career
Chancellor enrolled at Virginia Tech in 2006 to study human development. He worked out as a quarterback before eventually being moved to the cornerback position prior to the start of the season. He saw action that year as a true freshman in all 13 games, and recorded nine tackles, two broken up passes, and one interception.

In 2007, he was moved to the rover position as the starter and also played on special teams. He started in all 14 games and recorded 79 tackles, seven broken-up passes, three quarterback hurries, and one interception as a sophomore.

Before the 2008 season, Chancellor was moved to the free safety position, his third position change in three of four years at Virginia Tech. Chancellor started in all 14 games and recorded 52 tackles, of which 27 were solo, two interceptions, five broken-up passes, seven pass deflections, one forced fumble, and two fumble recoveries.
After the season, he considered entering the 2009 NFL Draft a year early, but decided to remain at Virginia Tech for his senior season.

Before his senior season in 2009, Hokies' defensive backs coach, Torrian Gray said that Chancellor could be "the greatest safety in Virginia Tech history. In his senior season, Chancellor recorded two interceptions, one fumble return, 68 total tackles, three tackles-for-loss, and four broken-up passes. Chancellor has said that he attempts to emulate the late Washington Redskins safety Sean Taylor, and said, "[He was a] big safety, the prototype guy for the position. I'm a big safety, too, and I've just always wanted to be just like him. I don't necessarily say I can be Sean Taylor before it's over, but I think I can be just as good." Also, before games and when he needs motivation, Chancellor says he watched the highlights of Sean Taylor on YouTube. He says it motivated him to do better, strive for greater things, and took him to a darker place which makes him play better. The CBS Sports-affiliated NFL Draft Scout considered Chancellor the third-ranked of the 126 free safeties available for the 2010 NFL Draft and projected him as a third-round selection.

Chancellor was elected to the Virginia Tech Sports Hall of Fame in 2022.

Professional career

2010
The Seattle Seahawks selected Chancellor in the fifth round with the 133rd overall pick in the 2010 NFL Draft. He was the second safety the Seahawks drafted in 2010, behind first round pick Earl Thomas, and was the ninth safety selected overall.

On June 2, 2010, the Seattle Seahawks signed Chancellor to a four-year, $2 million contract that includes a signing bonus of $213,000.

Throughout training camp, he competed for a job at strong safety against Lawyer Milloy, Kevin Ellison, and Jordan Babineaux. Head coach Pete Carroll named Chancellor the third strong safety on the depth chart to start the regular season, behind veterans Lawyer Milloy and Jordan Babineaux.

He made his professional regular season debut in the Seattle Seahawks' season-opening 31–6 victory against the San Francisco 49ers. On September 26, 2010, Chancellor recorded his first career tackle on Darren Sproles after Sproles returned a kickoff for 22 yards. Chancellor forced a fumble that was recovered by Dexter Davis. He finished their 27–20 victory with two solo tackles and one forced fumble. On October 31, 2010, Chancellor recorded two solo tackles and sacked quarterback Jason Campbell in the Seahawks' 33–3 loss at the Oakland Raiders. The following week, he collected a season-high seven combined tackles (five solo) in a 41–7 loss to the New York Giants. He finished his rookie season with 23 combined tackles (17 solo), a pass deflection, a sack, and a forced fumble in 16 games and no starts.

2011
Chancellor entered training camp slated as the starting strong safety after the Seahawks opted to not re-sign Lawyer Milloy. Defensive coordinator Gus Bradley officially named him the starting strong safety, alongside free safety Earl Thomas.

He started the Seattle Seahawks' season-opener at the San Francisco 49ers and recorded a season-high ten solo tackles in their 33–17 loss. On September 25, 2011, Chancellor collected five combined tackles, two pass deflections, and made his first career interception off a pass attempt by quarterback Kevin Kolb during their 13–10 victory against the Arizona Cardinals. He missed the following game (Week 4), after sustaining a quadriceps injury. On December 24, 2011, Chancellor tied his season-high of ten solo tackles during a 19–17 loss to the San Francisco 49ers. He finished his first season as a starter with 97 combined tackles (75 solo), a career-high 13 pass deflections, four interceptions, and a sack in 15 games and 15 starts. Chancellor ranked second for the Seahawks in both tackles and interceptions. On January 25, 2012, it was announced that Chancellor was added to the 2012 Pro Bowl roster as a replacement for Dashon Goldson of the San Francisco 49ers.

2012
Defensive coordinator Gus Bradley retained Chancellor and Thomas as the starting safeties to start the 2012 regular season. On October 14, 2012, he recorded a season-high 11 combined tackles (seven solo) during a 24–23 victory against the New England Patriots. In Week 11, Chancellor tied his season-high with 11 combined tackles (eight solo) in the Seahawks' 28–24 loss at the Detroit Lions. He finished his third season with a career-high 101 combined tackles (75 solo) and four pass deflections in 16 games and 16 starts.

2013
On April 22, 2013, the Seattle Seahawks signed Chancellor to a four-year, $28 million contract that included $17 million guaranteed and a $5 million signing bonus.

New defensive coordinator Dan Quinn retained Chancellor and Thomas as the starting safeties to begin the regular season. In Week 2, Chancellor recorded five combined tackles, broke up a pass, and intercepted a pass by Colin Kaepernick during the Seahawks' 29–3 victory against the San Francisco 49ers. On December 22, 2013, he collected a season-high 11 combined tackles (six solo), two pass deflections, and an interception as they lost 17–10 to the Arizona Cardinals. He finished the  season with 99 combined tackles (65 solo), six pass, and three interceptions in 16 games and 16 starts. He was named to his second Pro Bowl.

The Seattle Seahawks finished the season atop the NFC West with a 13–3 record and clinched a playoff berth and a first round bye. On January 11, 2014, Chancellor started his first career playoff game and recorded 14 combined tackles (four solo) and two pass deflections during the Seahawks' 23–15 victory against the New Orleans Saints in the NFC Divisional Round. The Seahawks defeated the San Francisco 49ers 23–17 in the NFC Championship and went on to Super Bowl XLVIII. On February 2, 2014, Chancellor made ten combined tackles (six solo), deflected two passes, and intercepted a pass by quarterback Peyton Manning as the Seahawks won Super Bowl XLVIII 43–8 against the Denver Broncos. He was ranked 65th by his fellow players on the NFL Top 100 Players of 2014.

2014
Chancellor began the season being selected as a team captain by his teammates, along with Russell Wilson, Jon Ryan, and Steven Hauschka. He started the Seattle Seahawks' season-opener against the Green Bay Packers and recorded a season-high 11 combined tackles (eight solo) during a 36–16 victory. On September 21, 2014, in a Super Bowl XLVIII rematch with the Denver Broncos, Chancellor recorded nine tackles, an interception, a forced fumble, and two passes defended in a 26–20 victory, winning the NFC Defensive Player of the Week Award. Chancellor earned another NFC Defensive Player of the Week nomination for his Week 12 game against the Arizona Cardinals. At the end of the regular season he was selected for the third Pro Bowl of his career and voted in the Second-team All-Pro by the Associated Press.

In the Seahawks' Divisional Round game against the Carolina Panthers, Chancellor had a career game in which he recorded nine solo tackles, two assists, and an interception, which was returned 87 yards for a touchdown. It was his third straight postseason game with an interception. Chancellor also vaulted the Panthers' offensive line twice in attempt to block a field goal at the end of the half, though neither attempt counted due to penalties. In the NFC Championship against the Green Bay Packers, Chancellor had four tackles in the 28–22 overtime victory. In Super Bowl XLIX, Chancellor recorded 10 tackles as the Seahawks failed to repeat as Super Bowl champions. They fell to the New England Patriots 28–24. He was ranked 41st by his fellow players on the NFL Top 100 Players of 2015.

2015
One year into his five-year extension, Chancellor requested a new contract. As of September 14, 2015, there had been no new contract talks between Chancellor and the Seahawks. Chancellor missed the first two games of the 2015 NFL season, a 31–34 overtime loss to the St. Louis Rams and a 17–27 loss to the Green Bay Packers. Chancellor returned to the 0-2 Seahawks in Week 3. The Seahawks went 10-4 since Chancellor's return. For his play in the 2015 season, he earned a trip to the 2016 Pro Bowl. He was ranked 32nd by his fellow players on the NFL Top 100 Players of 2016.

In the Wild Card Round of the postseason for the 2015 season, Chancellor would force a fourth quarter fumble of running back Adrian Peterson in a game against the Minnesota Vikings. The Seahawks would recover, and ultimately kick a field goal on the subsequent drive, giving the Seahawks a 10–9 lead, which would end up being the final score of the game after Blair Walsh missed a potential game-winning field goal in the final seconds. The Seahawks went on to lose in the Divisional Round to the eventual NFC Champion Carolina Panthers by a score of 31–24.

2016
Starting the 2016 season, Chancellor was named defensive team captain for the second time in his career, joining Russell Wilson, Jon Ryan, and cornerback DeShawn Shead as the four Seahawk captains. Chancellor earned NFC Defensive Player of the Week for his performance against the New England Patriots.

In the 2016 season, Chancellor had 47 tackles and two interceptions. The Seahawks would return to the playoffs. In the Wild Card Round victory against the Detroit Lions, Chancellor had six tackles. In the Divisional Round loss to the Atlanta Falcons, Chancellor had six tackles for the second consecutive playoff game. After the season, he was ranked 34th by his fellow players on the NFL Top 100 Players of 2017.

2017
On August 1, 2017, Chancellor signed a three-year, $36 million contract extension with $25 million guaranteed with the Seahawks. On November 18, it was revealed that Chancellor would miss the rest of the season after suffering a neck injury in Week 10. He was officially placed on injured reserve on December 16, 2017. Despite missing the final six games of the season due to that injury, Chancellor was named a Pro Bowl alternate at safety. Had he been able to play in the game he would have received the honor. Despite only playing in nine games, he was still ranked 75th by his peers on the NFL Top 100 Players of 2018.

2018
In a series of tweets on July 1, 2018, Chancellor said that the neck injury he had suffered in 2017 had not healed enough to allow him to return for the 2018 season. Although he never used the word "retirement," he strongly hinted that it was unlikely he would ever be medically cleared to play again. "To walk away from the game by choice is one thing," he tweeted. "To walk away from the game because of the risk of paralysis is another." Even before then, Carroll had said that Chancellor would have difficulty playing football again due to the severity of the injury. He was placed on the team's physically unable to perform list on July 26, 2018.

Chancellor remained on the Seahawks roster as his contract called for him to get $6.8 million of guaranteed money in 2018 and a $5.2 million injury guarantee in 2019; he could have potentially forfeited the money had he formally retired. Chancellor had the honor of raising the 12th Man flag for the Seahawks 2018 home opener and later revealed that he had spinal stenosis and bone spurs in his neck. On May 9, 2019, the Seahawks terminated Chancellor's contract after he had failed a physical.

NFL career statistics

Regular season

Postseason

Personal life 
As a child, Chancellor often visited the Boys and Girls club.

References

External links
 
 Virginia Tech Hokies bio

1988 births
Living people
African-American players of American football
African-American Christians
American football safeties
National Conference Pro Bowl players
Unconferenced Pro Bowl players
Players of American football from Norfolk, Virginia
Seattle Seahawks players
Virginia Tech Hokies football players
21st-century African-American sportspeople
20th-century African-American people